Ógra Chorcaí is a youth organisation in County Cork, Ireland and is affiliated with, and part funded by, the National Youth Council of Ireland.

The primary aim of Ógra Chorcaí is to actively work with young people of the community regarding development and educational opportunities and awareness on social issues in order that they participate and positively in their community and society.

The organisation operates under the structure of a limited company with a Board of Directors. It collaborates with the Irish Department of Education and Science, Department of Justice, Youth Affairs Section, Garda Síochána, City of Cork V.E.C., Cork County V.E.C., Cork Corporation, Youth Peoples Facilities & Services Fund, Local Drugs Task Force, Early School Leavers Initiatives, FÁS, and other voluntary, non-profit organisations and charities.

Ógra Chorcaí works with and for Young People in three ways:

Through Adult Volunteers and Leaders
Through Community based special intervention projects
Training for prospective youth workers – as a placement agency for National University of Ireland, Maynooth, University College Cork, Cork Institute of Technology, Waterford Institute of Technology and Community Gardaí.

See also
Education in Ireland
Youth club
Youth organisations

References

External links
 http://www.ograchorcai.org/ 
 National Youth Council website

Youth organisations based in the Republic of Ireland
Non-profit organisations based in the Republic of Ireland
Youth organizations established in 1966